Vista Transit Center is a station located in Vista, California, served by North County Transit District's SPRINTER light rail line and BREEZE bus line. The station is located midpoint between the rail line's western terminus at Oceanside Transit Center and eastern terminus at Escondido Transit Center. A preview Sprinter service stopped at Vista Transit Center on December 28, 2007, and regular service commenced March 9, 2008.

Platforms and tracks

References

External links

SPRINTER Stations

North County Transit District stations
Railway stations in the United States opened in 2008
Vista, California
2008 establishments in California